The Jinpen Dam is a rock-fill embankment dam on the Heihe River, a tributary of the Weihe River which flows into the Yellow River, in Zhouzhi County of Shaanxi Province, China. It serves as a multi-purpose dam; providing water for irrigation and municipal uses while also affording flood control and hydroelectric power generation. Water from the reservoir is used to irrigate crops in the Weihe River valley just below the dam. Along with the Shitouhe Dam to the west, the dam supplies the nearby city of Xi'an with municipal water. The power station at the dam has an installed capacity of 25 MW. Construction on the dam began in 1998 and the river was diverted in 1998. Filling of the reservoir began in 2000 and was complete in 2001. The power station was commissioned by 2002.

See also

List of dams and reservoirs in China
List of tallest dams in China

References

Dams in China
Hydroelectric power stations in Shaanxi
Dams completed in 2000
Rock-filled dams
Energy infrastructure completed in 2002
2000 establishments in China